Hakan Arslan (born 12 March 1989) is a Turkish professional footballer who plays as a left-back for the amateur side Doğugücü FK.

Professional career
Arslan made his professional debut with Erzurumspor in a 3-2 Süper Lig loss to Konyaspor on 12 August 2018.

References

External links
 
 
 

1989 births
People from Osmangazi
Living people
Turkish footballers
Turkey youth international footballers
Association football fullbacks
Boluspor footballers
Şanlıurfaspor footballers
Göztepe S.K. footballers
Büyükşehir Belediye Erzurumspor footballers
Kırklarelispor footballers
Karacabey Belediyespor footballers
Süper Lig players
TFF First League players
TFF Second League players
TFF Third League players